Gerald Kallan (born April 29, 1979) is an Austrian luger who has competed since the late 1990s. A natural track luger, he won the two men's singles medals at the FIL World Luge Natural Track Championships with a gold in 2000 and a bronze in 2003.

Kallan earned a pair of bronze medals in the men's singles event at the FIL European Luge Natural Track Championships (1999, 2004).

References
FIL-Luge profile
Natural track European Championships results 1970-2006.
Natural track World Championships results: 1979-2007

External links
 

1979 births
Living people
Austrian male lugers